Rebellion Research is a think tank and investment management firm and robo-advisor based in New York City established in 2003 by co-founders Alexander Fleiss, Jonathan Sturges, Jeremy Newton, and Spencer Greenberg.

Fleiss, Newton, and Sturges met at a math class at Amherst College, and later partnered with Greenberg, a graduate of Columbia University.

The fund is known for using Bayesian networks to generate market predictions. Their algorithm, nicknamed "Star," provides a human trader with a list of recommendations in the morning, which the trader implements.

Rebellion Research was one of the first firms on Wall Street to use artificial intelligence in 2006. and launched the first pure artificial intelligence investment fund (Guangfa Securities, 2017).

Rebellion Research's current CEO is Alexander Fleiss. (The New York Times, 2021).

References

External links

Hedge fund firms in New York City
Financial services companies based in New York City
Financial services companies established in 2006
2006 establishments in New York City